Conamara Chaos is a region of chaotic terrain on Jupiter's moon Europa. It is named after Connemara in Ireland due to its similarly rugged landscape.

Conamara Chaos is a landscape produced by the disruption of the icy crust of Europa. The region consists of rafts of ice that have moved around and rotated. Surrounding these plates is a lower matrix of jumbled ice blocks which may have been formed as water, slush, or warm ice rose up from below the surface. The region is cited as evidence for a liquid ocean below Europa's icy surface.

References

External links
 More images

Surface features of Europa (moon)